Chelan High School is a small rural public high school located in Chelan, Washington. It is located within the Cascade Mountains, lying on the edge of the North Cascades National Park and the Wenatchee National Forest. Chelan High School has an approximate enrollment of 415 students in grades 9–12. The school's mascot is the Mountain Goats, and the school colors are Green, White and Red.

Athletics
Chelan High School's mascot is the Mountain Goats and their school colors are Green, White and Grey. Chelan is a member of the Washington Interscholastic Activities Association and competes in the 1A Caribou Trail Conference. The Caribou Trail Conference consists of Chelan High School, Cascade High School, Cashmere High School, and Omak High School. The school participates in 14 sports, which are listed below.

Notable alumni
 Steve Kline - Class of 1966, former Major League Baseball player 
 Joe Harris - Class of 2010, current professional NBA player for the Brooklyn Nets, former basketball player for the University of Virginia, led university to first ACC regular season title since 1981, and named 2014 ACC tournament MVP.

References

Public high schools in Washington (state)
Schools in Chelan County, Washington